The 1965 Campeonato Nacional de Fútbol Profesional, was the 33rd season of top-flight football in Chile. Universidad de Chile won their fifth title, also qualifying for the 1966 Copa Libertadores.

League table

Results

Topscorer

References

External links
ANFP 
RSSSF Chile 1965

Primera División de Chile seasons
Chile
Prim